Alaa Shili (born November 10, 1987) is a Tunisian boxer who won the featherweight silver at the 2007 All-Africa Games and to qualified for the 2008 Olympics.

Career
At the All Africa final he lost to Abdelkader Chadi. At the Olympic qualifier Chadi beat him for a second time but a win over Thabiso Nketu was enough to get the third available berth. At the Olympics he beat German Wilhelm Gratschow 14:5 but lost to Mexican Arturo Santos Reyes2:14.

External links
 All Africa
 Qualifier
 sports-reference

1987 births
Living people
Featherweight boxers
Boxers at the 2008 Summer Olympics
Olympic boxers of Tunisia
Tunisian male boxers
African Games silver medalists for Tunisia
African Games medalists in boxing
Mediterranean Games bronze medalists for Tunisia
Competitors at the 2018 Mediterranean Games
Mediterranean Games medalists in boxing
Competitors at the 2007 All-Africa Games
21st-century Tunisian people